Greg McClure (1915–2012) was an American actor. His most notable film role was as John L. Sullivan in The Great John L. (1945) but in most of his twenty films he had only bit parts, often as a soldier or a boxer.

He signed a contract with Golden Gate Pictures, for whom he was meant to appear in Pillar Mountain (based on a book by Max Brand) and My Dog Shep.

References

External links

1915 births
2012 deaths
20th-century American male actors